Quatre frères was either American or Bermudian built vessel and commissioned in 1796 at Bordeaux as a French privateer. The Royal Navy captured her in April 1797 and took her into service as HMS Transfer. The Royal Navy sold her at Malta in 1802 to Ottoman Tripolitania. The U.S. Navy captured her in 1804 and took her into service as USS Scourge. The U.S. Navy sold her in 1812.

Quatre frères
Quatre frères was commissioned in 1796 in Bordeaux under Martial Dupeyrat. Under his command she captured two prizes: Résolution and Frascara, that she sent into Rochfort. Résolution, of Lisbon and of 500 tons (French, "of load"), Dos Santos (or Roze de Sautort), master, was a Portuguese vessel carrying wheat and almonds from the Barbary Coast. Frascara was a Danish vessel carrying oranges and lemons.

The 74-gun  captured Quatre frères in March 1797 in the Mediterranean.

HMS Transfer
The Royal Navy registered Transfer on 30 June 1797, and commissioned her in October under Commander George Bowen. Transfer, brig of 14 guns, is listed as being in Earl St Vincent's fleet in 1798. Commander George Mundy (or Munday), was promoted to command of Transfer on 24 December 1798. She was listed in Lord Viscount Keith's fleet in 1799.

On 11 February 1799, Transfer, under the command of Lieutenant George Miller (acting), captured the French privateer Escamoteur off Ayamonte. Escamoteur was armed with three 6-pounder guns and had a crew of 34 men.

On 4 April Transfer was under Mundy's command when she and the 74-gun  destroyed a French privateer of 14 guns and of unknown name. The two British ships were patrolling between Malaga and Cape de Gatt when they encountered the privateer, which they chased into a small bay where their quarry took refuge under the three guns of a circular fortress. Head money was paid in 1828, almost 30 years later.

Transfer was present at the surrender of the French garrison at Civitavecchia on 21 September. The British also captured the French polacca Il Reconniscento.

In October 1800 Commander Edward O'Brien took command of Transfer.

Next, under the command of Lieutenant John Nicholas, she served in Admiral Viscount Keith's Egyptian campaign of 1801. Prize money was paid in April 1823. In 1850 the Admiralty awarded the Medal for Egypt to the crews of any vessel that had served in the campaign between 8 March and 2 September 1801. Transfer is listed among the vessels whose crews qualified.

Commander Richard Cribb took command in April 1802, but the Navy paid-off Transfer in June 1802. It then sold her at Malta that same year for £700.

Tripolitanian Navy
Gaetano Andrea Schembri, consul for Ottoman Tripolitania, purchased Transfer at Malta. Tripoli then used her in blockade running during the Barbary Wars. , commanded by Lieutenant Charles Stewart, captured her off Tripoli on 18 or 21 March 1804. The Americans captured her for violating the conditions for the pass under which she had permission to pass through the blockade of the port of Tripoli.

USS Scourge
Commodore Edward Preble renamed the ship Scourge. On 17 April 1804, she joined Preble's squadron and participated in the blockade of Tripoli and also in the attacks on Tripoli. She was commanded by Lieutenants John H. Dent, John Rowe, Henry Wadsworth (acting lieutenant), and Ralph Izard in succession. On 30 November 1804, Izard sailed Scourge for the United States. She carried as a passenger Midshipman Frederick C. de Kraft, under arrest for having killed Midshipman William R. Nicholson in a duel on 19 November at Syracuse.

Once in the U.S., Scourge saw coastal service.

Fate
In 1812, the United States Navy declared Scourge unfit for further service and sold her at auction in Norfolk, Virginia.

Notes, citations, and references
Notes

Citations

References
 
 
 
 
 
 

1790s ships
Privateer ships of France
Captured ships
Brigs of the Royal Navy
Brigs of the United States Navy
Barbary Wars American ships
Naval ships of the Ottoman Empire